Asia Muhammad and Taylor Townsend were the defending champions but both players chose not to participate.

Magdalena Fręch and Katarzyna Kawa won the title, defeating Astra Sharma and Mayar Sherif in the final, 4–6, 6–4, [10–2].

Seeds

Draw

Draw

References
Main Draw

LTP Charleston Pro Tennis - Doubles